Pawnee Township is a township in Bourbon County, Kansas, United States.  As of the 2000 census, its population was 308.

Geography
According to the USGS, it contains two cemeteries: Hiattville and Saint Mary.

The stream of Little Pawnee Creek runs through this township.

Further reading

References

 USGS Geographic Names Information System (GNIS)

External links
 City-Data.com
 Bourbon County Maps: Current, Historic Collection

Townships in Bourbon County, Kansas
Townships in Kansas